This is a list of the High Sheriffs of County Durham, England.

In most counties the High Sheriff is the oldest secular office under the Crown. In the Palatinate of Durham the officeholder was appointed by and was accountable to the Bishop of Durham until 1836 when the Crown claimed authority. The High Sheriff was the principal law enforcement officer in the county but over the centuries most of the responsibilities associated with the post have been transferred elsewhere or are now defunct, so that its functions are now largely ceremonial. The High Sheriff changes every March.

High Sheriffs of County Durham
1146 Osbert

15th century
18 January 1401: Sir Robert Conyers
24 August 1406: Sir Percival de Lyndeley
2 June 1414: Sir William Claxton
2 January 1420: Robert Eure
6 May 1436: Sir William Bowes
4 October 1437: Robert Ogle
1 October 1438: William Pudsay
5 December 1441: Geoffrey Midleton
28 December 1461: John de Aderton
8 December 1462: Geoffrey Midleton
7 March 1467: William Claxton
6 August 1469: Henry Radclyff
14 August 1470: Sir George Lumley
20 November 1476: Robert Tempest
4 October 1482–1502: Sir Ralph Bowes

16th century
1503–15: Sir William Bulmer of Wilton Castle,(near Redcar)
1516–1517: Roger Lumley
1518–1522: Sir William Eure
1523–26: Sir William Bulmer of Wilton Castle,(near Redcar)
1527: Sir William Bulmer and John Bulmer (jointly)
1528–32: Sir John Bulmer
1533–?: William Hilton
1561: Robert Tempest of Holmside Hall
1569: Robert Bowes
1576: George Bowes
1576–1591: Sir William Hilton
1592–1594: George Conyers
1595–1610: Sir John Conyers of Sockburn Hall

17th century
1610–1624: Sir George Selby of Whitehouse, Ryton.
1625–1640: Sir William Belasyse of Morton House
1641: William Collingwood
1642: Sir William Darcy
1645: Henry Vane the Elder
1646: Sir George Vane of Barnard Castle
1647: Richard Belasyse of Morton House
1648: Clement Fulthorpe
1649: Sir James Clavering of Axwell House, Blaydon on Tyne
1651: Thomas Shadforth
1652: Christopher Fulthorpe of Tunstall Manor
1653: Francis Wren
1654: Rowland Place of Low Dinsdale Manor
1655: Thomas Bewick
1656: George Lilburn
1657–58: Timothy Whittingham
1659: Robert Ellison
1660–7: Sir Thomas Davison of Blakiston Hall.
1667–73: Sir Gilbert Gerard, 1st Baronet of Fiskerton
12 February 1671: Sir Gilbert Gerard, 1st Baronet of Fiskerton
1673: Sir James Clavering of Axwell House, Blaydon on Tyne
1674: Sir Gilbert Gerard, 1st Baronet of Fiskerton
1675–85: Nicholas Conyers
1686–1708: Hon. Charles Montagu

18th century
1709–1720: Mark Shafto of Whitworth Hall
1721–23: Sir Henry Liddell, 3rd Bt of Newton Hall
1723–47: Sir William Williamson, 4th Bt of Whitburn
1747–89: Sir Hedworth Williamson, 5th Bart. of Whitburn
1780: Andrew Robinson Stoney-Bowes of Gibside
1789–1810: Sir Hedworth Williamson, 6th Bart. of Whitburn

19th century
1810–1814: Adam Askew of Redheugh
1815–1818: William Hutchinson
1819–1826: William Keppel Barrington
1827–1828: Cuthbert Ellison of Hebburn Hall
1829–1833: Charles John Clavering of Axwell House
1833–1836: William Lloyd Wharton of Dryburn
1837: Anthony Wilkinson, of Coxhoe Hall
1838: Sir Robert Johnson-Eden, Bart., of Windlestone Hall
1839: Sir William Chaytor, Bart., of Witton Castle
1840: Sir Hedworth Williamson, Bart. of Whitburn
1841: William Russell of Brancepeth Castle
1842: Robert Eden Duncombe Shafto of Whitworth Park
1843: Edward Shippersden of Durham
1844: Henry Witham of Lartington Hall
1845: John William Williamson of Whickham
1846: Ralph Stephen Pemberton of Barnes and Usworth House
1847: John Fawcett of North Bailey
1848: Sir William Eden Bt of Windlestone Hall
1849: John Eden of Beamish Park
1850: Robert Hilyard of Horsley Hall
1851: Robert Henry Allan, of Blackwell Hall and Blackwell Grange
1852: John Bowes, of Streatham Castle
1853: Frederick Acklom Milbank, of Hart
1854: Henry John Baker Baker, of Elemore Hall
1855: Robert Surtees of Redworth House
1856: Robert Smith Surtees of Hamsterley Hall
1857: William Beckwith, of Silksworth House
1858: Timothy Hutchinson, of Eggleston Hall
1859: Sir William Aloysius Clavering, Bart., of Axwell House
1860: Henry John Spearman, of Burn Hall
1861: Richard Lawrence Pemberton, of Barnes
1862: Henry George Surtees of Dinsdale Hall
1863: John Richard Westgarth Hildyard, of Horsley Hall
1864: John Harrison Aylmer of Walworth Castle
1865: William Peareth, of Usworth House
1866: William Edward Surtees, of Seaton Carew
1867: William Scurfield Grey, of Norton
1868: Anthony Wilkinson, of Hulam
1869: Thomas Charles Thompson, of Sherburn Hall
1870: William Briggs, of Hylton Castle, Sunderland
1871: James Cookson, of Neasham Hall
1872: Rowland Burdon, of The Castle, Castle Eden
1873: Charles Freville Surtees, of Mainsforth, Ferryhill
1874: John Fogg Elliot, of Elvet Hill, Durham
1875: Anthony Wilkinson, of Durham
1876: Henry Edward Surtees, of Redworth House and Redforth Grove
1877: Sir Hedworth Williamson, Bart., of Whitburn Hall
1878: John Joicey, of Newton Hall, Stocksfield, Northumberland
1879: James Laing, of Thornhill, Sunderland
1880: George John Scurfield, of Hurworth House
1881: Matthew Kearney, of the Ford, Lanchester
1882: Robert Anthony Burrell, of Fairthorne, Botley, Hants
1883: Alfred Backhouse, of Pilmore, Darlington
1884: Isaac Lothian Bell, of Rownton Grange, Northallerton
1885: Christopher John Foyle Fawcett, of The North Bailey, Durham
1886: Joseph Richardson, of Potto Hall, Swainby, Northallerton
1887: Gerald Percy Vivian Aylmer, of Walworth Castle, Darlington
1888: David Dale of West Lodge, Darlington
1889: Lindsay Wood, of The Hermitage, Chester-le-Street
1890: William James Joicey, of Urpeth Lodge, Chester-le-Street
1891: Joseph Henry Straker, of Willington House, Willington
1892: Sir William Gray, of Greatham Cottage, West Hartlepool
1893: Edward Joicey, of Whinney House, Low Fell, Gateshead-on-Tyne
1894: Colonel Charles John Reed CB, of Springwell Hall, Durham
1895: Hugh Bell of Redbarns, Coatham, Redcar
1896: Major Robert Ropner, of Preston Hall, near Stockton-on-Tees
1897: Colonel Lancelot Allgood Gregson, of Burdon, Sunderland
1898: Samuel Peter Austin, of Cocken Hall, Fence Houses
1899: Utrick Alexander Ritson, of Calf Hall, Muggleswick Park, Consett, and Jesmond Gardens, Newcastle upon Tyne
1900: John Arundel Hildyard, of Horsley House, Eastgate, Darlington

20th century

1901: George Frederick Boyd of Moorhouse, Leamside
1902: Sir William Henry Edward Chaytor of Croft, Darlington
1903: John Ewer Jefferson Hogg of Elm Park Gardens, SW London
1904: Sir Hedworth Williamson of Whitburn Hall, near Sunderland
1905: John Edwin Rogerson of Mount Oswald, Durham
1906: Frank Stobart of Biddick Hall
1907: Rowland Burdon of The Castle, Castle Eden
1908: Slingsby Duncombe Shafto of Beamish Park
1909: William Cresswell Gray of Tunstall Manor, West Hartlepool
1910: Hon. James Arthur Joicey of Longhurst, Morpeth (later Baron Joicey)
1911: Lieut-Colonel John Henry Ropner, of Ragworth, Norton, Stockton-on-Tees
1912: Frederick Stirling Newall, of Castle Hill, Wylam-on-Tyne
1913: James Westell, of The Cloisters, Sunderland
1914: Francis Priestman, of Shotley Park, Shotley Bridge
1915: Sir Alfred Molyneux Palmer, of Walworth Castle, Darlington
1916: William Hustler Hustler, of Acklam Hall, Middlesbrough
1917: The Honourable Cyril Arthur Liddell, of Ravensworth Castle, Gateshead
1918: Brodrick Dale, of Apperley Dene, Stocksfield
1919: John Wood, of Coxhoe Hall, Coxhoe
1920: Arthur Francis Pease, of Middleton Lodge, Middleton Tyas
1921: Col. Maurice Bell (later Sir Maurice Bell) of Rounton Grange, Northallerton
1922: Sir John Storey Barwick, of Ashbrook Grange, Sunderland
1923: Capt. Rowland Burdon Webster, of Wolviston Hall, Stockton-on-Tees
1924: Sir Frank Brown, of Norton Priory, Stockton-on-Tees
1925: Lieut.-Col. George Herbert Stobart,  of Harperley Park, Harperley
1926: Sir Thomas Garmondsway Wrightson, Bt., of The Manor House, Eryholme, near Darlington
1927: Brigadier-General Herbert Conyers Surtees, of Mainsforth Hall, Ferryhill
1928: John Henry Bacon Forster, of Whitworth House, Spennymoor
1929: Major Henry Siward Balliol Surtees, of Redworth Hall, Darlington
1930: John Stapylton Grey Pemberton, of Ramside, Durham
1931: Capt. Geoffrey Stirling Newall, of Shepherds Dene, Riding Mill, Northumberland
1932: Henry Peile, CBE, of Broomshiels Hall, Satley, Tow Law, Co. Durham
1933: Sir Arthur Nicholas Lindsay Wood, of The Hermitage, Chester-le-Street
1934: Standish Robert Gage Prendergast Vereker of Hamsterley Hall
1935: Col Frank Robert Simpson  of Bradley Hall, Wylam
1936: Major Johnathan Lee Priestman of Shotley Park
1937: Leonard Ropner, of Preston Hall, Stockton-on-Tees
1938: Sir William Gray,  of Tunstall Manor, West Hartlepool
1939: Frank Nicholson, of Southill Hall, near Chester-le-Street
1940: Colonel Sir Robert Chapman, of Undercliff, Cleadon, Sunderland
1941: Col. Harold Edward Kitching, of Elmwood, Hartburn, Stockton-on-Tees
1942: Col. Sir Thomas Andrews Bradford, of Aden Cottage, Durham
1943: Col. Hereward Sprot, of St. John's Hall, Wolsingham
1944: Captain Edward Ramsden, of Sands Hall, Sedgefield
1945: Colonel Charles Edwin Vickery,  of Whorlton Grange, Whorlton, Barnard Castle
1946: Lieutenant-Colonel Richard Laurence Stapylton Pemberton, of Hawthorn Tower, Seaham
1947: Edward John Westgarth Hildyard, of Horsley Hall, Eastgate
1948: Major Frank Douglas Nicholson,  of Quarry Hill, Brancepeth
1949: Captn Sydney Riley Lord of Newbus Grange, Neasham
1950: Lt Col. Robert Appleby Bartram of Broomshiels Hall, near Bishop Auckland
1951: Colonel Thomas George Greenwell,  of Thornley Cottage, Tow Law, Bishop Auckland, Co. Durham
1952: Philip Ivan Pease, of Sledwick, Barnard Castle
1953: Major Sir (Lawrence) Andrew Common, DSO, of Hunter House, Shotley Bridge
1953: Thomas Hawksley Summerson, of Hall Garth, Coatham Mundeville, Darlington
1954: Brigadier Leslie Harrison McRobert,  of Meadowcroft, West Hartlepool
1955: Major Sir Basil Robert James Simpson, of Bradley Hall, Wylam
1956: Maurice Oliver Pease,  of Eldon House, Heighington, Darlington
1957: Major Aubone Bryce Surtees, of Hurworth Hall West, Hurworth-on-Tees, Darlington
1958: John Raymond Ropner, of Middleton Lodge, Middleton Tyas, Richmond, Yorks
1959: Sir John Gamrondsway Wrightson, of Neasham Hall, Darlington
1960: Lieut-Colonel Robert Macgowan Chapman of Cherry Tree House, Cleadon, near Sunderland
1961: Richard Boys-Stones, of Kyo Close, Wylam-on-Tyne
1962: Roger Trelawny Backhouse, of The East House, Great Smeaton, Northallerton, Yorkshire
1963: Commander Shannan Stevenson, of White Hall, Haughton-le-Skerne, Darlington
1964: John Charles Hedley Booth, of Meadow Bank, Castle Eden
1965: Christopher William Drewett Chaytor, of Croft Hall, Croft, near Darlington
1966: James Kenneth Hope, of West Park, Lanchester
1967: Colonel James Wadham Grant,  of Northolme, Moor Lane, Whitburn
1968: Peter Guy Edwards, of Low Walworth Hall, near Darlington
1969: Norman Carse Marr, of Belle Vue, East Boldon, County Durham
1970: Ralph Meredyth Turton, T of The Hall, Kildale, Yorkshire
1971: William Talbot Gray, of Eggleston Hall, Barnard Castle
1972: Sir James Steel, of Fawnlees Hall, Wolsingham
1973: Colonel Hugh Kirton,  of Plawsworth House, Plawsworth, Chester-le-Street
1974: Elizabeth Scylla Riley Lord, of Low Dinsdale Old Rectory, Neasham, near Darlington
1975: Thomas Richard Featherstone Fenwick, of Bishop Oak, Wolsingham, Bishop Auckland
1976: Lieut.-Colonel Michael Radcliffe Kerens, of The Old Vicarage, Bolam, Darlington
1977: Major William Kemp Trotter, of The Deanery, Staindrop, near Darlington
1978: Colonel Sir William Allison Lee, of The Woodlands, Woodland Road, Darlington
1979: Captain Gerard Maurice Salvin, of Croxdale Hall, Durham
1980: Paul Douglas Nicholson, of Quarry Hill
1981: Lieut-Colonel Robert Benjamin Humphreys, of Peppermires Cottage, Brancepeth, Durham
1982: George Christopher Bartram, of Eldon House, Heighington Village, Newton Aycliffe
1983: Frederick Guy Beadon, of Little Newsham Hall, Winston, Darlington
1984: John Wood Snowdon, of The Old Rectory, Brandsby, York
1985: David James Grant, of Aden Cottage, Whitesmocks, Durham
1986: Rosemarie Hume Gray, of Eggleston Hall, Eggleston, Barnard Castle
1987: Ian George Bonas, of Bedburn Hall, Hamsterley
1988: Robert Patrick Thompson, of The Old Rectory, Wycliffe, Whorlton, Barnard Castle
1989: James Tyrell Brockbank, of The Orange Tree, Shincliffe, Durham City
1990: Captain John Hubert McBain, of Westholme Hall, Winston, Darlington
1991: Sir Anthony Frederick Milbank, of Barningham Park, Richmond, North Yorkshire
1992: Elizabeth Ann Jennings, of Broomshiels Home Farm, Saitley, Bishop Auckland
1993: Desmond Walker
1994: Nicholas David Barclay Straker, of Sough Hill, Caldwell, Darlington
1995: Robert Sale, of Eryholme Grange, Hurworth, Darlington
1996: James Allan Marr, of Brancepeth
1997: Michael Philip Weston, Prebends Gate, 3 Quarryheads Lane, Durham City
1998: Sir William Gray, Eggleston Hall, Eggleston, Barnard Castle
1999: Frank Nicholson, Cocken House, Chester-le-Street
2000: Elizabeth Ann Smyth, Greenbank, Heighington, Darlington

21st century

References

Bibliography

 
Durham
History of County Durham
High Sheriff of Durham